Marko Tepavac (born 5 April 1994) is a Serbian professional tennis player, mainly competing on the ATP Challenger Tour.

On 24 October 2016, he reached his best singles ranking of world No. 174, while on 19 June 2017, he peaked at world No. 584 in the doubles rankings. In May 2016, he won his first trophy on the ATP Challenger Tour, winning Karshi Challenger in Uzbekistan.

Tepavac made his ATP main draw debut as a lucky loser at 2017 Garanti Koza Sofia Open, losing in the first round to Mikhail Youzhny.

ATP Challenger Tour and ITF Futures finals

Singles: 24 (17–7)

Doubles: 7 (4–3)

External links 
 
 

1994 births
Living people
Serbian male tennis players
Tennis players from Belgrade